Heinrich Wilhelm Teichgräber (3 April 1809 – 2 April 1848) was a German lithographer and artist.

Life 
Born in Oschatz, from 1824 to 1828, Teichgräber was a student at the Dresden Academy. From about 1831 until his death aged 38, he worked as a drawing teacher and stone draughtsman in Dresden.

Further reading 
 Teichgräber, Carl Friedrich August. In Hans Vollmer (publisher.): Thieme-Becker. Established by Ulrich Thieme and Felix Becker. Volume 32: Stephens–Theodotos. E. A. Seemann, Leipzig 1938. (im Artikel zum Bruder).

References

External links 

 

German lithographers
1809 births
1848 deaths
People from Oschatz